David Scott was an American politician who was elected in 1816 as a Democratic-Republican member of the United States House of Representatives to represent Pennsylvania's 10th congressional district.

Scott resigned from the Fifteenth Congress before it assembled on December 1, 1817, having been appointed president and judge of the court of common pleas.

References

Sources
The Political Graveyard

18th-century births
19th-century deaths
Year of birth unknown
Year of death unknown
Place of birth unknown
Place of death unknown
Democratic-Republican Party members of the United States House of Representatives from Pennsylvania
Judges of the Pennsylvania Courts of Common Pleas